Julio F. Navarro FRSC (born October 12, 1962 in Santiago del Estero, Argentina) is a professor of Astronomy (Ph.D. Universidad Nacional de Córdoba, Argentina) at the department of Physics and Astronomy in the University of Victoria. Dr. Navarro's research is mainly focused on the formation and evolution of galaxies and galaxy clusters and the structure and evolution of their dark matter component. He is famous for his theoretical studies of dark matter halos accompanied by massive N-body simulations. Julio F. Navarro along with Carlos Frenk and Simon White have formulated a density profile for dark matter halos, which were named after them. In 2015, he won the Henry Marshall Tory Medal of the Royal Society of Canada. He is chief editor of the journal Frontiers in Astronomy and Space Sciences.

References 

Julio F. Navarro official site.
Vancouver Sun:Julio Navarro: UVic prof a pioneer in researching dark matter
Canadian Institute for Advance Research Profile
Royal Society of Canada Fellow Search

1962 births
Living people
Argentine physicists
Argentine astrophysicists
20th-century Argentine astronomers
Academic staff of the University of Victoria
Fellows of the Royal Society of Canada
21st-century Argentine astronomers